High Sheriff of Kingston upon Hull is a ceremonial title conferred by Hull City Council as a civic honour on prominent people associated with Kingston upon Hull. Hull has had a High Sheriff since 1440. The position was abolished in 1974 and revived in 2013. Before 1974 the Sheriff usually served for one year; the incumbent since 2013 has been Baroness ?(Virginia) Bottomley.

History
Hull was made a county corporate in 1440, sometimes called Hullshire. All English counties had a sheriff as the head of local justice; as local government evolved the position of High Sheriff became increasingly ceremonial. The Local Government Act 1888 redesignated the county corporate of Hull a county borough which retained its civic officers. The Local Government Act 1972 abolished the county borough and officers from April 1974.

In 2012, Hull City Council issued a "loyal address" to mark Elizabeth II's diamond jubilee asking for permission to revive the offices of High Sheriff and High Steward. When this was granted in 2013, the council refurbished the Sheriff's pre-1974 chain of office. The chain was funded by a bequest from Colonel Rupert Alexander Alec-Smith, who had served as Sheriff of Hull between 1949 and 1950, Lord Mayor of Hull in 1970 and 1971, and Lord Lieutenant of Humberside in 1980–83. The first appointee was  former Conservative minister Virginia Bottomley, chancellor of the University of Hull.

List

See also
 List of mayors of Kingston upon Hull
 List of stewards of Kingston upon Hull

References

Sources

Citations

Sheriffs
Kingston upon Hull
 
Sheriffs